Istad AS is a power company based in the town of Molde in Møre og Romsdal county, Norway. The company owns the power grid in the municipalities of Aukra, Eide, Fræna, Gjemnes, Midsund, and Molde. It also operates a fiberoptic broadband in Molde.  The company owns a 25% stake in the power plants on the river Driva.

The company dates back to 1918, and got the present corporate structure in 1981. It is owned by Trondheim Energi (subsidiary of Statkraft, 49%), Molde Municipality (34%), and Moldekraft (17%).

References

Electric power companies of Norway
Companies based in Molde
Public utilities established in 1918
Statkraft
Energy companies established in 1918
Telecommunications companies established in 1918
1918 establishments in Norway